Street Sounds Electro 1 is the first compilation album in a series released 1983 on the StreetSounds label. The album was released on LP and cassette and contains eight electro and old school hip hop tracks mixed by Herbie Laidley.

Track listing

References

External links
 Street Sounds Electro 1 at Discogs

1983 compilation albums
Hip hop compilation albums
Electro compilation albums